Grande-Synthe is a railway station in Grande-Synthe, Hauts-de-France, France.

History

The station is located on the Dunkerque–Calais railway line. The station is served by TER (local) services between Calais and Dunkerque, operated by SNCF.

A large goods yard is also at the station, also called Grande-Synthe.

References

Railway stations in Nord (French department)